Parapediasia murinellus is a moth in the family Crambidae. It was described by Zeller in 1863. It is found in Brazil.

References

Crambini
Moths described in 1863
Moths of South America